Wuhan virus (named for Wuhan, China) may refer to:
 Wuhan virus, an informal name for the SARS‑CoV‑2 virus, generally associated with xenophobia related to the pandemic
 Wuhanvirus, a genus of bacterial viruses in the family Autographiviridae
 Wuhan spiny eel influenza virus, an unclassified Influenza B-like virus within the Orthomyxoviridae family